Cynhn (stylized in all caps as CYNHN (СУИНИ, スウィーニー)) is a Japanese idol girl group formed in 2017. They released their debut single, "Finalegend", on November 1, 2017.

History
Cynhn debuted in November 2017 with the single, "Finalegend". Their second single, "Haribote", was released in April 2018, followed by their third single, "Tachypsychia / So Young", in September 2018, and their fourth single, "Zekkō Kyōshū / Amairo Hologram", in December 2018. Their fifth single, "Kūki to Ink / Wire", was released in March 2019. They released their first studio album, Tablature, in June 2019. Their sixth single, "2-ji no Parade", was released in November 2019. Manari Ōsaka graduated from the group in December 2019. Their seventh single, "Suisei", was released in March 2020. They released their eighth single, "Goku Heibon na Ao wa,", in September 2020. Their first EP, #0F4C81, was released in December 2020. Soto Sakino graduated from the group in January 2021. They released their ninth single, "Aoawase", was released in July 2021. Their second album, Blue Cresc., was released in February 2022. Minori Hirose joined the group in June 2022. They released their tenth single, "Kilig Near", in August 2022.

Members

Current
Shiki Ayase (綾瀬志希) (2017–present)
Neru Tsukumo (月雲ねる) (2017–present)
Rei Momose (百瀬怜) (2017–present)
Tōru Aoyagi (青柳透) (2017–present)
Minori Hirose (広瀬みのり) (2022–present)

Former
Manari Ōsaka (桜坂真愛) (2017–2019)
Soto Sakino (崎乃奏音) (2017–2021)

Discography

Studio albums

Extended plays

Singles

References

External links
 

Japanese girl groups
Japanese idol groups
Japanese pop music groups
Musical groups from Tokyo
Musical groups established in 2017
2017 establishments in Japan